Masquerade in Mexico is a 1945 comedy film directed by Mitchell Leisen. It stars Dorothy Lamour and Arturo de Córdova.

Plot
Ill on the flight to Mexico City, honest banker Tom Grant doesn't know that Angel O'Reilly, seated nearby, has slipped a diamond into his pocket. She is traveling with the decidedly dishonest Boris Cassal, smuggling the gem for him, but slips away at the customs checkpoint while Tom is detained.

Boris has taken the precaution of stealing her pocketbook, so Angel needs to rely on taxi driver Pablo's generosity. He even helps her land a job as a singer, lying to the club's owner that Angel is a countess from Spain.

She is performing one night while Tom is at a table with estranged wife Helen and her new bullfighter beau, Manolo. It becomes obvious that Manolo is taken with Angel when she joins them. Tom encourages this, not being comfortable with Helen's seeing another man.

Tom offers to bankroll Angel's pretense as a countess, paying for a luxurious hotel suite and wardrobe. Boris is on to the charade, so when Angel is accused of being a fraud, Boris comes to the rescue by pretending to be the contessa's count.

Manolo and Boris each wants Angel for himself, but she's finding Tom more and more to her liking. She persuades him that Boris was to blame for her stunt at the airport, and while the bullfighter gallantly steps aside, Boris satisfies his own desires by stealing Helen's necklace.

Cast
Dorothy Lamour as Angel O'Reilly
Arturo de Córdova as Manolo Sergovia
Patric Knowles as Thomas Grant
Ann Dvorak as Helen Grant
George Rigaud as Boris Cassal

References

External links

1945 films
1945 comedy films
Paramount Pictures films
Films directed by Mitchell Leisen
American black-and-white films
American comedy films
1940s American films